Corynebacterium otitidis is a coryneform Gram-positive bacterium first isolated from patients with otitis media.

References

Further reading
Poulter, Melinda D., and Claudia J. Hinnebusch. "Turicella otitidis in a young adult with otitis externa." Infectious Diseases in Clinical Practice 13.1 (2005): 31–32.

External links

LPSN
Type strain of Turicella otitidis at BacDive -  the Bacterial Diversity Metadatabase

Corynebacterium
Bacteria described in 1994